Derrick Mensah Antwi (born 1 June 2004) is a Ghanaian footballer who currently plays as a defender for Ghana Premier League side WAFA.

Career 
Antwi started his career with West African Football Academy, he was promoted to the senior team in March 2021 ahead of the second round of the 2020–21 season after distinguishing himself with the academy's U17 side. Two months after, he made his debut on 12 May 2021, coming on as a substitute for Derrick Mensah in the 67 minute of a 2–1 win over Medeama SC. On 23 June 2021, in his first match as a starter against Aduana Stars, he put up an impressive performance to help WAFA win the match by 3–1. At the end of the match, he was adjudged the man of the match. During his debut season, he made seven league appearances.

References

External links 

 

2004 births
Living people
Association football defenders
Ghanaian footballers
West African Football Academy players
Ghana Premier League players